Zeb Vance Walser (June 17, 1866 – February 17, 1940) was a North Carolina attorney and politician. Named for Governor Zebulon B. Vance, Walser nevertheless became active in the Republican Party rather than Vance's Democrats.

Biography
Zeb V. Walser was born at Yadkin College, North Carolina on June 17, 1866. He was admitted to the bar in 1886 and began practicing law in Lexington, North Carolina. He attended Yadkin College, the University of North Carolina, and the University of Michigan Law School. He was elected to the North Carolina House of Representatives in 1888, and to the North Carolina Senate in 1890.  In 1894, Walser was again elected to the state House, which elected him Speaker for one term after Republicans and Populists formed a majority.

In 1896, Walser was elected North Carolina Attorney General. In 1900, he became official reporter for the North Carolina Supreme Court.

In 1912, Walser served as state campaign manager for Theodore Roosevelt's unsuccessful presidential campaign.

He died in Lexington on February 17, 1940, at age 76.

Notes

External links
Binkley Walser law firm history

1866 births
1940 deaths
North Carolina Attorneys General
North Carolina state senators
Members of the North Carolina House of Representatives
People from Davidson County, North Carolina
Speakers of the North Carolina House of Representatives
University of Michigan Law School alumni
University of North Carolina alumni